30 km/h zones (30 kilometres per hour zones) and the similar 20 mph zones (20 miles per hour zones) are forms of speed management used across areas of urban roads in some jurisdictions. Although these zones do have the nominal speed limit posted, speeds are generally ensured by the use of traffic calming (physical or psychological) measures, though limits with signs and lines only are increasingly used in the UK.

Reasons for implementation

These zones are generally introduced in areas, particularly residential areas, in an attempt to keep road traffic speeds down to a safe level. The philosophy behind such zones is that the streets in the zone are public space, and they seek to help strike a balance between the realities of an urban area bustling with pedestrian activity and the circulatory function of the roadways. Streets in these zones are considered to be a space for people who live, work, play and study in the area, while people who cross the zone to get somewhere else are excluded. The theory is to reduce rat running while improving the safety and quality of life in the area.

Research has shown that reducing driver speeds in built-up areas reduce injuries for all road users, including motorists, bicyclists, and pedestrians. The link between vehicle speed and pedestrian crash severity has been established by research studies, with crash severity increasing as a function of motor vehicle speeds. If a vehicle hits a pedestrian while traveling  most pedestrians will survive a crash, often sustaining only minor injuries. Minor increases in impact speed have been shown to have a profound effect on crash severity. The dramatic differences in fatality rates are a key part of the theory behind 20 mph and 30 km/h zones. Other studies have revealed that lower speeds reduce community severance caused by high speed roads in neighbourhoods, i.e. there is more neighborhood interaction and community cohesion when speeds are reduced to 30 km/h.

Objectives
The objectives of the implementation of zones are to help:
 Provide safe street crossings
 Improve the quality of life
 Increase levels of walking and cycling
 Reduce obesity through increased active living
 Reduce rat running and cut through traffic
 Reducing motor vehicle traffic volumes and speeds
 To reduce road crash rates, injuries and fatalities to all road users
 Reduce greenhouse gas emissions, air pollution and noise pollution
 Foment an area where pedestrians, cyclists and motorists coexist safely and comfortably
 Develop public space that is open and safe for everyone, including people with disabilities
 Increase the space available for walking, biking, and people on the street to eat, play and enjoy life
 Provide a safe area for children in school zones
 Increase real estate values of local homes and businesses
 Increase the economic vitality of the area
 Strengthen the sense of community

Benefits
Compared to normal signed but unenforced speed limits, these type of speed zone generally deliver the required traffic speeds because of their traffic calming aspects.

A 2015 review of various studies found that 20 mph zones and limits are effective in reducing accidents and injuries, traffic speed and volume.

Death is much less likely if a pedestrian is hit by a car travelling at 20 mph than at 30 mph or more. The limited evidence from existing 20 mph schemes shows marked reductions in deaths and casualties.

Lower traffic speeds contributes towards less congestions, less air pollution, lower emissions, stronger communities and reduced obesity.

Prevalence

Europe
In European countries 30 km/h zones have been used widely. On September 1, 1992, the city of Graz, Austria, became the first European city to implement a citywide 30 km/h limit on all roads except its largest. Significant 30 km/h zones are ubiquitous across the Netherlands. In Switzerland 30 km/h zones have been allowed by law since 1989 and they were first established in Zürich in 1991.

In  2017, most of all IRTAD countries have a default speed limit in urban areas of 50 km/h, with various lower speeds, for instance, in the Netherlands, 70% of the urban roads are limited to 30 km/h.

A network of 67 European NGOs organised a European Citizens' Initiative (ECI) "30kmh - making streets liveable" collected signatures of support for a 30 km/h speed limit as the normal limit for the European Union. 50 km/h speed limits would then become exceptions. Local authorities would be able to decide on these exceptions and set other speed limits on their street network.

In Munich 80% of the 2,300 kilometers of urban road network have a speed limit of 30 km/h or less, remaining roads are limited at 50 km/h.

85% of Madrid's streets are limited to 30 km/h. In May 2021 the government of Pedro Sánchez rolled out a new regimen of speed limits that limits most urban streets to 30 km/h, some to 20 km/h and the rest to 50 km/h depending on the number of lanes and whether the sidewalk is physically separated from street level.

Lyon has the wider 30 km/h zone, with an area of 500 hectares (or 5 square kilometers) covering 87 km of road lanes.

in January 2021 Brussels enacted 30 km/h as the default maximum speed for the entire Brussels Capital Region.  The authorities claim that this is the largest 30 km/h zone to date.  According to sources the area of the Brussels capital area is 162 km².

In France, town with most zone 30 kilometers are: Toulouse: 479,5 km, Angers: 461 km, Paris: 396,7 km, Lorient: 214,5 km, Grenoble: 213,7 km, Tours: 183,2 km et Nantes: 179,1 km.

Montpellier starts with 30 km/h zone on 1 August 2021.

Since 30 August 2021, Parishas 30 km/h zone on most of the city except périphérique, boulevards des Maréchaux and few other streets.

Since Wednesday 30 March 2022, Lyon has 30 km/h speed limit on 84% of its streets against only 37% previously. this means that 610 kilometres have a 30 km/h speed limit out of a total of 627 kilometres.

United Kingdom 
There is significant action across the UK, both by organisations and local councils, to implement more 20 mph limits and zones in local communities. 20's Plenty for Us list populations in UK local authorities committed to wide-area 20 mph limits at over 15 million people at March 2016, with over half of the largest UK 40 urban authorities having agreed a Total 20 mph policy.

Some towns define the 20 mph zone as the general speed limit across the city, with a higher speed for main roads.

United States
In the US,  speed limits exist along linear routes, but are slow to catch on for area-wide implementation. New York City is leading the way with neighborhood-scale 20 mph zones and is currently  re-engineering  of streets per year for conversion to 20 mph zones.

Ten US states already allow  or  speed limits for linear routes, as follows:

Alaska stipulates  speed limits in alleys and  limits in business districts.
In Delaware school zones have  speed limits.
Florida has school zones which usually have  to  limits. Most use signing and flashing yellow lights during school times, but there is debate surrounding the efficacy of these measures.
In North Carolina, the Central Business Districts (CBDs) have a statutory speed limit of  unless otherwise posted. They use "Reduce Speed Ahead" signage instead of the more common "Reduced Speed Ahead" signage.
In Oregon, rather than having a “when children are present” speed limit, they have a  speed limit with a time-of-day system, usually school days, 7 a.m. to 5 p.m.
Pennsylvania generally uses  speed limits for school zones during arrival and departure times.
In Rhode Island the default speed limit is  within  of a school, which starts to emulate a  zone but is not an area-wide speed limit.
A school zone includes  adjacent to the school (or school road) in both directions.

Mexico 
Mexican cities which have established  zones (Zonas 30):
Monterrey, Nuevo León: in Barrio Antiguo
Guadalajara, Jalisco: in Historic Downtown
Zapopan, Jalisco: in Historic Downtown
Los Mochis, Sinaloa: in Downtown

Oceania

Australia 
 Residential streets of Melbourne suburbs Fitzroy and Collingwood are zoned 30 km/h.
 Leibig Street in Warrnambool is zoned 30 km/h 
 Sydney CBD's only 30 km/h street is Druitt Street, next to Town Hall station. Other 30 km/h zones in Sydney include in the Centennial Park, Bi-centennial Park and in the Botanic Gardens.
 On 11 July 2020, Northern Beaches Council reduced the speed limit of Manly's town centre to 30 km/h. Liverpool city centre in Sydney's south west followed suit on 17 July.

New Zealand 

 A number of suburban shopping areas around Wellington have had 30 km/h limits since ca. 2010.
 In the Wellington Central Business District, 30 km/h limits will be put in place from the end of July 2020.
 The central area of New Plymouth was converted to 30 km/h in Jul 2012.
 The town centre of Blenheim was reduced to 30 km/h in Aug 2014.
 A 30 km/h zone was introduced in central Christchurch since Mar 2016.
 A series of neighborhood greenways in Christchurch have had 30 km/h limits applied to them, including Papanui Parallel, Uni-Cycle, Quarrymans Trail, Rapanui/Shag Rock, and Heathcote Expressway.
 A growing number of central city main streets in various New Zealand cities have been converted to 30 km/h, including Queen St (Auckland), Victoria St (Hamilton), and George St (Dunedin).
 The beachside area of Mt Maunganui in Tauranga has been 30 km/h since Aug 2011. The city centre of Tauranga was also reduced to 30 km/h in Oct 2018.
 In Auckland, 30 km/h speed limits were introduced in July 2017 for the Wynyard Quarter and Viaduct Harbour areas.

References

Traffic law
Road speed limit